Ainsworth (archaically known as Cockend) is a small village—effectively a suburb—within Radcliffe, in the Metropolitan Borough of Bury, in Greater Manchester, England.

Historically a part of Lancashire, Ainsworth was formerly a chapelry in the parish of Middleton and hundred of Salford. It was added to the Radcliffe Urban District in 1933. Author and ghostwriter Paul Stenning is a former resident and pupil of Ainsworth County Primary School.

References

Villages in Greater Manchester
Geography of the Metropolitan Borough of Bury
Radcliffe, Greater Manchester